The Fricot Nugget is a crystalline gold nugget found in El Dorado County, California in 1865 during the California Gold Rush by William Russell Davis. The nugget was found in Davis' Grit Mine at Spanish Dry Digging's at a depth of 60.96 metres (200 feet). The Fricot Nugget weighed 5.69 kilograms (201 ounces or 12.56 pounds), and was later shipped to New York where it was purchased by Jules Fricot for approximately $3,500. Fricot took the nugget to Paris for the 1878 Paris Exposition. Following the Paris Exposition, the Fricot Nugget was missing until 1943 when it was found in a safe deposit box in Calaveras County, California. The nugget came close to being stolen in 2012 when a theft occurred at the California State Mining and Mineral Museum where the nugget was being held, however safety measures protected the Fricot Nugget from the intruders. The nugget is listed as the eleventh largest gold nugget ever found and is the second largest gold nugget found in the United States of America. The Fricot Nugget is currently the largest surviving single piece of gold from the California Gold Rush. It is on permanent display in the California State Mining and Mineral Museum.

References 

California Gold Rush

Gold nuggets